Go! is the third studio album released by the hard rock band Fair Warning.

Track listing
All songs written by Ule W. Ritgen except where noted.
 "Angels of Heaven" – 5:10 (Helge Engelke)
 "Save Me" – 5:11 (Engelke)
 "All On Your Own" – 5:09
 "I'll Be There" – 4:30
 "Man On the Moon" – 4:45 (Engelke)
 "Without You" – 4:04
 "Follow My Heart" – 3:43
 "Rivers of Love" – 3:55
 "Somewhere" – 4:47
 "Eyes of a Stranger" – 4:47
 "Sailing Home" – 4:25 (Engelke)
 "The Way You Want It" – 3:59
 "The Love Song" – 3:55
 "Without You" (Different version) – 4:40
 "Light In the Dark" – 4:28 (Engelke)
 "Angels of Heaven" (Karaoke version) – 5:10 (Engelke)
 "Follow My Heart" (Different version) – 3:55

Personnel
Tommy Heart – vocals
Helge Engelke – guitars
Andy Malecek – guitars
Ule W. Ritgen – bass guitar
C. C. Behrens – drums

References

External links
Heavy Harmonies page

Fair Warning (band) albums
1997 albums